Sajjad Hussain Palash known professionally as Palash is a Bangladeshi singer. In 2013, he won the Bangladesh National Film Award for Best Male Playback Singer for the film Khodar Pore Ma.

Selected films
 Bir Soinik - 2003
 Ayna - 2006
 Akkel Alir Nirbachon - 2008
 Evabey Bhalobasha Hoy - 2010
 Khodar Pore Ma - 2012
 Pita - 2012
 Antor Jala - 2017

Awards

References

21st-century Bangladeshi male singers
21st-century Bangladeshi singers
Living people
Best Male Playback Singer National Film Award (Bangladesh) winners
2001 births